The Old Cathedral of Plasencia (Spanish:  or ) is a Roman Catholic church in the city of Plasencia, Province of Cáceres, Extremadura, Spain. It is one of two buildings, along with the New Cathedral, that make up the Cathedral of Plasencia. Commonly known as the Cathedral Museum of Plasencia, the building is an example of the transition from Romanesque to Gothic architecture, and is one of the most notable buildings in the town.

Construction began at the beginning of the 13th century, and the last proto-Gothic contributions occurred in the 15th century. During these centuries the architecture was carried out by teachers such as Juan Francés, Juan Pérez or Diego Díaz. It is currently considered Bien de Interés Cultural (a 'Good of Cultural Interest').

History 

The Old Cathedral of Plasencia is an example of a transitional building from Romanesque to Gothic architectural styles. To the Romanesque style belong the fustis and capitals of its columns, while to the Gothic style belong its arches and windows, discovered in one of the most recent restorations. Its three naves were covered from the 18th century by a thick mantle of lime, which only after decaying has allowed observers to admire the slenderness of a solemn cathedral.

During the second stage of construction, throughout the 14th century, the church itself, the bell tower and the eastern and southern rooms of the cloister were completed.

In the third and last stage, during the 15th century, the main chapel of the church was modified and the cloister was finished on the west and south sides. At this time, foundation problems were encountered, which caused the collapse of part of the western portal and whose reform was used to create new burial chapels in the church. In this period, the last master builders of the church were Juan Martín and Bishop Pedro Jiménez.

The cathedral was declared a Monumento Histórico-Artístico belonging to the National Artistic Treasury of Spain by a decree of 3 June 1931. It is listed on the Spanish national heritage register Bien de Interés Cultural.

Currently the cathedral is dedicated in part to the Cathedral Museum of Plasencia, which includes a set of paintings and sculptures by Spanish and Flemish Renaissance artists such as Luis de Morales and Gerard David. It also exhibits religious ornaments and devotional objects from the 15th to the 17th centuries.

Building 

In the parts that are still standing today, the Romanesque origins are visible, although sometimes the solutions used were close to proto-Gothic style. It corresponded to the type of Romanesque church with three naves, with a larger central apse and two smaller ones on the sides, although currently there are three naves without apses. The highest central nave maintains its original ribbed vaults with tiercerons and simple vaults in the lateral naves.

Originally, the back wall was formed by the main chapel, separated from the main nave by a small stairway. On both sides were two other smaller chapels. The one on the Gospel side was called that of the crucifix and the one on the Epistle side was called Our Lady of Forgiveness or of the Blessed Sacrament because the tabernacle was located there. The images in these chapels were placed in new locations, like the Chapel of San Pablo, or different places in the New Cathedral. Currently in a small altarpiece in the central chapel, a carving of the young Virgin is venerated.

Portal 

The main portal is a refined example of Romanesque architecture, with semicircular arches with the classic archivolts over which, in a simple niche, is a sculptural group carved in stone of the Annunciation of Our Lady, which also appears on the rose window in a small image, and before her a praying angel.

Currently it can also be accessed through the so-called western door, incorrectly called the door of forgiveness, which would rather correspond to the missing door of the northern transept and which would date back to the beginning of the 13th century.

Cloister 

The cloister, with an irregular plan, bears a clear transition from Romanesque to Gothic typical of the old cathedral. It is reminiscent of Romanesque style in its columns and capitals, with biblical scenes, and references to Gothic style in the arches and ribbed vaults. The west and south naves are of clear Cistercian style. The center of the courtyard is occupied by a Gothic fountain from the 15th century, with coats of arms of the bishop and cardinal Juan de Carvajal.

It currently serves as a meeting point and junction between the two cathedrals and hosts tombs of distinguished clergy in the pavement.

Chapel of San Pablo or 

If there is one part of the Romanesque building that should stand out, it is undoubtedly the old Chapter House or Chapel of San Pablo and popularly known as  due to the grooved sphere at the top.

The Chapel of San Pablo follows the model of the group of "lantern towers" of the Kingdom of León's cathedrals of Zamora and Salamanca, the collegiate church of Toro, as well as the Cathedral of Évora in Portugal. Its initial origin is to be found in the French Romanesque, particularly in the religious buildings of the Poitou region.
Miguel Sobrino has suggested the now-gone Romanesque dome over the Cathedral of Santiago de Compostela is the first of the type of dome also used in the Old Cathedral of Plasencia.
The most suitable date for the completion of its works would be 1270, at the hands of the master builder Gil de Císlar, possible master stonemason trained in Petrus Petri's workshop.

It is a room with a square floor, which becomes an octagon through ribbed tubes that make up a vault with sixteen ribs. On the outside, the double canopy dome is a steep and conical element, covered with layers in the form of scales, which hinder the erosion that rainwater can produce.

Sometimes changes in the use of the chapter house led to changes in adaptability, as occurred in 1508, when the library donated by Dr. Gutiérrez Álvarez was installed in it, or as in 1544, when it was converted into the main chapel while the back wall of the cathedral was demolished.

See also 
 New Cathedral of Plasencia
 History of medieval Arabic and Western European domes

References

Bibliography 
 CALLE CALLE, Francisco Vicente, Plasencia. "Misterios" en las Catedrales, www.bubok.com, 2008.
 ARAUJO, S. NADAL, J. "Restauración del conjunto Catedrales-Palacio Episcopal de Plasencia", 1995.
 
 La arquitectura religiosa en Plasencia. Las catedrales antigua y nueva. VIII Centenario de la diócesis de Plasencia. Jornadas de estudios históricos. pp. 107 a 142 . Plasencia 1990.
 Las catedrales de Plasencia. Rev. El Urogallo, diciembre de 1995.

External links 

 Web of information about the Cathedrals of Plasencia (in Spanish)
 Information of the City of Plasencia (in Spanish)

Buildings and structures in the Province of Cáceres
Plasencia
13th-century Roman Catholic church buildings in Spain
15th-century Roman Catholic church buildings in Spain
Plasencia
Bien de Interés Cultural landmarks in the Province of Cáceres
Romanesque architecture in Extremadura
Gothic architecture in Extremadura
Churches in Extremadura